John Lovett (born April 25, 1996) is an American football fullback for the Miami Dolphins of the National Football League (NFL). He played college football at Princeton.

College career
Lovett was used as a quarterback, running back, and wide receiver at Princeton. As a senior, he compiled 1,833 yards, 18 touchdowns and three interceptions while rushing 141 times for 894 yards and 13 touchdowns. Lovett was a two-time Bushnell Cup winner which is awarded to the Ivy League’s top offensive player. Lovett finished his college career with 2,509 yards passing, 1,591 yards rushing and 553 yards receiving.

Professional career

Kansas City Chiefs
Lovett was signed by the Kansas City Chiefs as an undrafted free agent on May 9, 2019, after participating in a rookie mini-camp. He was moved to the halfback and tight end positions during training camp. The Chiefs placed Lovett on season-ending injured reserve on August 27, 2019. Lovett was waived by the Chiefs on July 29, 2020.

Green Bay Packers
Lovett was claimed off waivers by the Green Bay Packers on July 30, 2020. He was waived during final roster cuts on September 5, 2020, and was signed to the practice squad the next day. He was elevated to the active roster for the week 1 game against the Minnesota Vikings and for the week 2 game against the Detroit Lions, and then reverted to the team's practice squad following each game. He made his NFL debut on September 13 against the Vikings. He was promoted to the active roster on September 26, 2020. He was placed on injured reserve on November 14, 2020, with a torn ACL. He was waived with a "failed physical" designation on March 12, 2021.

Miami Dolphins
On February 18, 2022, Lovett signed with the Miami Dolphins. He was placed on injured reserve on August 23, 2022.

NFL career statistics

Regular season

References

External links
Princeton Tigers bio

1996 births
Living people
American football fullbacks
Princeton Tigers football players
Green Bay Packers players
Kansas City Chiefs players
Players of American football from New York (state)
American football quarterbacks
People from Woodbury, Nassau County, New York
Miami Dolphins players